Artur Andreyevich Gachinski (born 13 August 1993) is a Russian former figure skater. He is the 2011 World bronze medalist, the 2012 European silver medalist, the 2010 World Junior bronze medalist, and a two-time Russian national silver medalist (2011, 2012). He announced his retirement from competitive skating in December 2015, citing injuries.

Personal life 
Artur Andreyevich Gachinski was born 13 August 1993 in Moscow. He received roller skates at age six but soon switched to ice skating. At age nine, Gachinski moved with his family to Saint Petersburg for training. Initially, he competed under his mother's surname , which was romanized as Khil or Hill. After a discussion with his family, he decided to take his father's surname, Gachinski. His mother is a painter.

Career

Early career 
Gachinski's parents brought him to a rink when he was six years old. At age nine, he was accepted as a pupil by Alexei Mishin in Saint Petersburg but was coached mainly by his wife, Tatiana Mishina, for the first few years.

In the 2005–2006 season, Gachinski won the junior bronze medal at the Russian Championships. In the 2006–2007 season, he was placed 8th on the junior level and 14th on the senior level at the Russian Championships.

2007–2008 season 
The 2007–2008 season was the first season in which Gachinski was old enough to compete in the ISU Junior Grand Prix series. He competed in two events, and was placed 4th in his debut in Romania and winning silver in Estonia. Gachinski qualified for the Junior Grand Prix Final, where he was placed 8th. He won the gold medal in the junior level at the 2007 Coupe de Nice and was placed 9th at the 2008 Russian Championships.

2008–2009 season 
Competing in the 2008–2009 ISU Junior Grand Prix, Gachinski won silver at the Spanish event and was placed fourth in Great Britain, thus qualifying for the 2008–2009 ISU Junior Grand Prix Final, where he finished 8th again. He made his senior international debut at the 2008 Golden Spin of Zagreb, where he was placed 8th. At the 2009 Russian Championships, Gachinski was placed 10th in the senior level and won the silver medal in the junior level. Although he was originally named to the team to the 2009 World Junior Championships, he withdrew from the event before the event began due to illness.

2009–2010 season 
The 2009–2010 season was Gachinski's third on the ISU Junior Grand Prix circuit. He won gold in Belarus and silver in Germany, qualifying him for the 2009–2010 ISU Junior Grand Prix Final, in which he was placed 6th. Gachinski won senior gold at the 2009 Coupe de Nice. At the 2010 Russian Championships, he was placed 13th in the senior level and the gold medalist in the junior level. In 6th after the short program at the 2010 World Junior Championships, Gachinski earned enough points in the free skate to take the bronze, despite popping his planned quad.

2010–2011 season 
Gachinski competed solely in the senior level in the 2010-2011 season. He began with wins at 2010 Finlandia Trophy and Coupe de Nice. He picked up a viral infection a week before 2010 Skate Canada. Gachinski finished 7th at the event, his debut on the senior Grand Prix. He was placed 6th in his second GP assignment, the 2010 Rostelecom Cup.

Gachinski won his first senior national medal, silver, at the 2011 Russian Championships behind Konstantin Menshov. Gachinski was assigned to his first European Championships where he finished fifth, ahead of Menshov, and was given Russia's sole berth to the men's event at the World Championships. He won the bronze in his first appearance at the event.

2011–2012 season 
In preparation for the 2011–2012 season, Gachinski took part in Mishin's training camps in Jaca (Spain), Tartu (Estonia), and Pinzolo (Italy) and worked with Stéphane Lambiel. Gachinski was assigned to 2011 Cup of China and 2011 Rostelecom Cup for the Grand Prix season. He won the short program but finished 5th overall at Cup of China, and also finished 5th at the Rostelecom Cup.

Gachinski won silver at the 2012 Russian Championships. At the 2012 European Championships, he was first in the short program and second in the long program, finishing with an overall score of 246.27 points. Gachinski won the silver medal behind teammate Evgeni Plushenko, who is also coached in Saint Petersburg by Alexei Mishin.

Gachinski changed his boots two weeks before the 2012 World Championships, affecting his preparation. He finished 18th at the event. After the event, Mishin said that Gachinski was not entirely ready and perhaps should have withdrawn. Gachinski was named in the Russian team to the 2012 World Team Trophy but withdrew from the event and was replaced by Zhan Bush.

2012–2013 season 
Gachinski struggled throughout the season both with physical and psychological issues. After he was placed ninth at the 2012 Skate Canada International and seventh at the 2012 Rostelecom Cup, he finished fourth at the 2013 Russian Championships and was not selected to compete at the 2013 European Championships. He finally won a gold medal in his final event of the season, the 2013 Triglav Trophy.

2013–2014 season 
In 2013–14, Gachinski started his season with a bronze medal at the 2013 Finlandia Trophy. After being placed eighth at the 2013 Skate America and sixth at the 2013 Rostelecom Cup, he finished sixth at Russian nationals and was not included in the Russian team to the European Championships, Winter Olympics, or World Championships.

Gachinski moved to Moscow on 6 January 2014 and began working with Tatiana Tarasova, Alexander Uspenski and Maxim Zavozin.

Programs

Competitive highlights

2007–present

2003–2007

Detailed results 

(Small medals for short and long programs are awarded only at ISU Championships.)

References

External links

 
 Artur Gachinski at sport-folio.net
 Artur Gachinski at Tracings.net

Russian male single skaters
Figure skaters from Moscow
Living people
1993 births
World Figure Skating Championships medalists
European Figure Skating Championships medalists
World Junior Figure Skating Championships medalists
Universiade medalists in figure skating
Universiade bronze medalists for Russia
Competitors at the 2015 Winter Universiade